Cypraeovula kesslerorum is a species of sea snail, a cowry, a marine gastropod mollusc in the family Cypraeidae, the cowries.

Description
The length of the shell attains 25.2 mm.

Distribution
This marine species occurs off the eastern coast of South Africa, between Port Alfred and western Transkei, around East London

References

 Lorenz, F., 2006. A new Cypraeovula from South Africa (Gastropoda: Cypraeidae). Club Conchylia informationen 37(3-4): 14-15
 Bouchet, P.; Fontaine, B. (2009). List of new marine species described between 2002-2006. Census of Marine Life

Endemic fauna of South Africa
Cypraeidae
Gastropods described in 2006